Are You Listening may refer to:
 Are You Listening!, a Bangladeshi film
 Are You Listening? (film), a 1932 MGM drama film
 Are You Listening? (album), by Dolores O'Riordan, 2007
 Are You Listening?, an album by Emery, 2010